Tappen is an unincorporated community in British Columbia. The settlement is located on the shores of Shuswap Lake. It is colloquially known as "Rust Valley", and is the location of the TV show Rust Valley Restorers. The area of the community was originally named Tappen Siding, according to the Vernon & District Family History Society and was named after Canadian Pacific Railway construction contractor Herbert Tappen. A sawmill was built in 1883 and Tappen first appeared on BC Land maps in 1891. A year later the Tappen Siding post office opened in 1892, though it was closed a few years later in 1897.

References

Designated places in British Columbia
Settlements in British Columbia